Brief Episodes of Joy is the sixteenth album from Arthur Loves Plastic and was released in 2008.

Awards
Brief Episodes of Joy won the 2008 Wammie for Best Recording in the Electronica Category. In the 2009 Just Plain Folks Music Awards Brief Episodes of Joy was nominated in the Electronica Album category, while the track "Unbelievable (Techno Squirrels remixed by ALP)" was nominated in the Electronica Song category.

Release notes
"Lisa Moscatiello lends her vocals to this brooding release that explores the depths between twilight and sunrise."

Track listing

The track "Time Marches On" is also known as "Killer Bees".

Personnel
Produced by Bev Stanton in the Flamingo Room and at Sligo House, Silver Spring, MD.

Additional musicians
Lisa Moscatiello - Vocals (1, 2, 7, 8, 10, 12)
Lisa Moscatiello - Guitar (2, 4, 8)
Cystem - Guitar Loops (3, 9, 11, 12) *
Jon Nazdin - Bass (5)
Robbie Magruder - Drums (10, 11)

* Remixed for The Tapegerm Collective

Samples 
Dialogue from "Nights of Love in Lesbos", a reading of The Songs of Bilitis by Pierre Louÿs (4)

References

Arthur Loves Plastic albums
2008 albums